HMS Thisbe was an  destroyer which served in the Royal Navy during World War I. The R class were an improvement on the previous M class with geared steam turbines to improve efficiency. Built by Hawthorn Leslie and launched on 8 March 1917, the destroyer served as part of the Harwich Force. In 1918, the destroyer towed a flying boat on a lighter to take part in operations off the coast of Heligoland, although the aircraft failed to take off. After the war, the destroyer was placed in reserve, and participated in trials with the Compass Department in 1925. The ship was sold to be broken up on 31 August 1936.

Design

Thisbe was one of twelve  destroyers ordered by the British Admiralty in March 1916 as part of the Eighth War Construction Programme.{ The R class were a development of the preceding , but differed in having geared turbines to improve fuel consumption, the central gun mounted on a bandstand and minor changes to improve seakeeping.

Three funnels were fitted.

Armament consisted of three  Mk IV QF guns on the ship's centreline, with one on the forecastle, one aft on a raised platform and one between the second and third funnels. A single 2-pounder  "pom-pom" anti-aircraft gun was carried, while torpedo armament consisted of two rotating twin mounts for  torpedoes. The ship had a complement of 82 officers and ratings.

Service
The ship was laid down by Hawthorn Leslie and Company in Hebburn in 13 June 1916 with the yard number 492. Launched on 8 March 1917, the destroyer was completed on 6 June 1917. The vessel was the third to be named after Thisbe, a woman of Babylon from Greek mythology.

On commissioning, Thisbe joined the Tenth Destroyer Flotilla of the Harwich Force. The deployment was part of a wider expansion of the destroyer force in the navy. Towards the end of the war, the Navy looked to alternative ways of attacking the Germans, particularly the fast but short range Thornycroft Coastal Motor Boats and Curtis Large American flying boats. A lighter was developed that could be towed by destroyers, taking the faster craft close to the enemy. On 10 August 1918, Thisbe, towing a flying boat on a lighter and accompanied by six Coastal Motor Boats, joined a fleet of four light cruisers and thirteen destroyers to sail for Heligoland and attack German shipping. Initially, the assignment was not a success as the aircraft failed to take off and the boats were all sunk or interned, but subsequently one of the aircraft launched by one of the other destroyers shot down the Zeppelin LZ 100.

Thisbe remained part of the Tenth Destroyer Flotilla at the end of the war, but was placed in reserve at Nore on 24 February 1920. In 1925, the destroyer was attached to the Compass Department and took part of a trial of six different compasses, including a gunnery compass. On 31 August 1936, Thisbe was given to Thos. W. Ward of Sheffield in exchange for RMS Majestic and was subsequently broken up at Pembroke Dock.

Pennant numbers

References

Citations

Bibliography

 

 
 
 
 
 
 
 
 

1917 ships
R-class destroyers (1916)
Ships built on the River Tyne
World War I destroyers of the United Kingdom